Walter Francis Willcox (March 22, 1861 – October 30, 1964) was an American statistician. He was born in Reading, Massachusetts, to William Henry Willcox and Anne Holmes Goodenow. He was graduated from Phillips Academy, Andover, in 1880, from Amherst College in 1884 with an A.B., and in 1888 received an A.M. degree from Amherst College. He received an LL.B degree (1887) and a Ph.D. (1891) from Columbia University. In 1906 he received an honorary LL.D. degree from Amherst College.

Life
Willcox was a Cornell University faculty member from 1891 to 1931 within the President White School of History and Political Science. He held the presidency of the American Statistical Association from 1911 to 1912 and of the American Economic Association in 1915. As well as essays and magazine articles, he published The Divorce Problem, A Study in Statistics (1891; second edition, 1897), and Supplementary Analysis and Derivative Tables, twelfth census (1906). He contributed the "Negroes in the United States" subsection to the "Negro"  article  in the 1911 Encyclopædia Britannica. (The main section, by Thomas Athol Joyce,
is of interest today for the insight it gives into racial prejudices of the time.)

Willcox initiated the first statistics course at Cornell in 1892, one of the earliest university courses in statistics in the United States, and one among 16 universities with such courses in the 1890s.  His research interest was in vital statistics. Emil Julius Gumbel described his body of work, collected in Studies in American Demography, as "the type of old-fashioned writings which will continue to be of value notwithstanding all progress achieved in mathematical statistics."

In 1911, Willcox claimed there would be "no children in the United States under five years of age" by the year 2020. Perpetuating ideas of race suicide, Willcox erroneously explained that the United States' birth rate meant that importing babies from France would be the only option for maintaining population levels.

After serving as one of five chief statisticians for the U.S. Census in 1900, Willcox proved that for any method of apportionment that involves rounding, a priority list can be created by dividing the rounding point into each state's population, by which each seat can be assigned in successive order based on each state's priority listings.

His son, Alan Willcox, served as general counsel to the U.S. Department of Health, Education and Welfare.

Publications
 Studies in American Demography, Ithaca, New York: Cornell University Press (1940).
 International Migrations, Volume II: Interpretations (Editor), New York: National Bureau of Economic Research (1931).
 Walter Francis Willcox papers, #14-10-504. Division of Rare and Manuscript Collections, Cornell University Library.

References

1861 births
1964 deaths
Phillips Academy alumni
20th-century American mathematicians
American statisticians
American centenarians
Men centenarians
Amherst College alumni
Columbia Law School alumni
Cornell University Department of History faculty
Presidents of the American Statistical Association
Presidents of the International Statistical Institute
20th-century American essayists
Presidents of the American Economic Association